The sixth season of the American television series Arrow premiered on The CW on October 12, 2017, and concluded on May 17, 2018, with a total of 23 episodes. The series is based on the DC Comics character Green Arrow, a costumed crime-fighter created by Mort Weisinger and George Papp, and is set in the Arrowverse, sharing continuity with other Arrowverse television series. The showrunners for this season were Marc Guggenheim and Wendy Mericle. Stephen Amell stars as Oliver Queen, with principal cast members David Ramsey as John Diggle, Willa Holland as Thea Queen, Emily Bett Rickards as Felicity Smoak, Echo Kellum as Curtis Holt and Paul Blackthorne as Quentin Lance also returning from previous seasons. Katie Cassidy, a principal cast member from seasons one to four and a guest actor for season five, was reinstated as a series regular for the sixth season as Laurel Lance / Black Siren. They are joined by Rick Gonzalez as Rene Ramirez and Juliana Harkavy as Dinah Drake, who were promoted to series regulars from their recurring status in the previous season.

The series follows billionaire playboy Oliver Queen (Stephen Amell), who claimed to have spent five years shipwrecked on Lian Yu, a mysterious island in the North China Sea, before returning home to Starling City (later renamed "Star City") to fight crime and corruption as a secret vigilante whose weapon of choice is a bow and arrow. In the sixth season, after an explosive battle on Lian Yu, Oliver must balance being a vigilante, the mayor, and a father to his son, William. At the same time, new enemies emerge, initially led by terrorist hacker Cayden James (Michael Emerson), who allies himself with various criminals including drug dealer Ricardo Diaz (Kirk Acevedo), metahuman vigilante Vincent Sobel (portrayed by Johann Urb, voiced by Mick Wingert when masked), Russian mobster Anatoly Knyazev (David Nykl), and metahuman Black Siren. As James loses control of his cabal, Ricardo Diaz comes to the fore and kills him, revealing that he manipulated James into believing Oliver killed his son, and announcing to Green Arrow his scheme to take over Star City's criminal underworld and control the city's political infrastructure, all while Oliver must contend with his former teammates forming a rival team. As Diaz takes control of the city, Oliver is forced to recruit the aid of the FBI, in exchange for him publicly announcing his identity and going to federal prison. In the finale, Oliver is imprisoned in a maximum security penitentiary.

The series was renewed for its sixth season on January 8, 2017, and filming began in Vancouver, British Columbia on July 6, 2017, and ended in late April 2018. The season received mixed reviews from critics compared to other seasons of the series. This season includes the fourth annual Arrowverse crossover with TV series The Flash, Legends of Tomorrow and Supergirl, and with elements from Freedom Fighters: The Ray. The season was released on DVD and Blu-ray on August 14, 2018. The series was renewed for a seventh season on April 2, 2018.

Episodes

Cast and characters

Main 
 Stephen Amell as Oliver Queen / Green Arrow
 David Ramsey as John Diggle / Spartan / Green Arrow
 Willa Holland as Thea Queen / Speedy
 Emily Bett Rickards as Felicity Smoak / Overwatch
 Echo Kellum as Curtis Holt / Mister Terrific
 Rick Gonzalez as Rene Ramirez / Wild Dog
 Juliana Harkavy as Dinah Drake / Black Canary
 Katie Cassidy as Laurel Lance / Black Siren
 Paul Blackthorne as Quentin Lance

Recurring 
Jack Moore as William Clayton
Kathleen Gati as Raisa
David Nykl as Anatoly Knyazev
Sydelle Noel as Samanda Watson
Venus Terzo as Elisa Schwartz
Michael Emerson as Cayden James
Tobias Jelinek as Sheck
Johann Urb as Vincent Sobel / Vigilante
Evan Roderick as Nick Anastas
Kirk Acevedo as Ricardo Diaz / Dragon
Pej Vahdat as Sam Armand
Eliza Faria as Zoe Ramirez
Tina Huang as Kimberly Hill

Guest

Production

Development 
On January 8, 2017, The CW renewed Arrow for a sixth season. This was the final season to feature Wendy Mericle as showrunner; Marc Guggenheim served as co-showrunner.

Writing 
The fifth-season finale ended with Oliver Queen and William Clayton witnessing the island Lian Yu explode as a result of Adrian Chase shooting himself, a dead man's switch, with many of Oliver's allies still on the island. Guggenheim said the fates of the characters would be revealed in the sixth season, but cautioned, "I know everyone is trying to determine who survives, who dies, what is the result of the cliffhanger based upon people's contractual status, and I would say that's not necessarily a good idea". He compared this to The Walking Dead season six finale because it had "a group of characters, all of whom were series regulars, in a dire situation at the end of their season. Just because they were series regulars did not mean that everyone came out of that cliffhanger alive." He also said the theme of the sixth season would be "family", adding that "last year we spent a whole season really building up this team, this new Team Arrow, and this year we’ve got the team in place – what sort of damage can we do? So much of Arrow lives in the challenges and trials that we put the characters through."

Casting 
Main cast members Stephen Amell, David Ramsey, Willa Holland, Emily Bett Rickards, Echo Kellum and Paul Blackthorne return from previous seasons as Oliver Queen, John Diggle, Thea Queen, Felicity Smoak, Curtis Holt and Quentin Lance. Rick Gonzalez and Juliana Harkavy, who recurred in the fifth season as Rene Ramirez and Dinah Drake respectively were promoted to the principal cast for the sixth season. Katie Cassidy, who portrayed Laurel Lance / Black Canary as a regular from season one to four and recurred as the character's Earth-2 doppelganger Black Siren in season five, was reinstated as a regular for season six, playing the latter role. Cassidy also portrayed the Earth-1 Laurel in "Fundamentals". As with the fifth season, Holland was contracted only to appear in a limited number of episodes, but Guggenheim declined to reveal how many exactly. Holland left the series after her contract expired, her final appearance as a regular being "The Thanatos Guild". This was also Blackthorne's final season as a regular; he left after the season finale. Former series regulars Manu Bennett and Josh Segarra returned as Slade Wilson and Adrian Chase respectively in a guest capacity. Colin Donnell, also a former series regular, returned for two different roles as a guest: the Earth-X version of Tommy Merlyn who is that Earth's Prometheus; and Christopher Chance / Human Target disguised as the Earth-1 Tommy. Colton Haynes, who starred as Roy Harper / Arsenal in seasons two and three and was a guest star in season four, again returned in a guest capacity.

Design 
Maya Mani designed the costumes for the season. Oliver's Green Arrow suit from the fifth season is retained in the sixth without any changes. Additionally, he wears his original "Hood" outfit from the first season during the episode "Fundamentals". In the sixth season, Diggle gains a new Spartan costume and helmet, which eschew the gray overtones of previous Spartan costumes, and instead have a black and red scheme. The Wild Dog costume for the season was substantially revamped; while the original introduced in season five consisted of "a hockey jersey, hockey mask and holsters", the new costume was made to be more tactical and armor-like, while retaining the older costume's color scheme. The Black Canary costume introduced in the season consists of a domino mask, long gloves and a bo staff.

Filming 
Filming for the season began on July 6, 2017, in Vancouver, British Columbia. The episode "Thanksgiving" re-uses archive footage of Billy Joel from his concert of August 4, 2015, at the Nassau Coliseum in Long Island, performing the song "No Man's Land". To do this, Guggenheim personally wrote to Joel seeking permission. Filming for the season ended in late April 2018.

Arrowverse tie-ins 
In May 2017, The CW president Mark Pedowitz officially announced plans for a four-show Arrowverse crossover event, crossing over episodes of the television series Supergirl, The Flash, Legends of Tomorrow, and Arrow. The crossover, Crisis on Earth-X, began with Supergirl and a special airing of Arrow on November 27, 2017, and concluded on The Flash and Legends of Tomorrow on November 28. Throughout the crossover, Stephen Amell also portrayed Oliver's Earth-X doppelganger Dark Arrow. Patrick Sabongui, who recurs as David Singh on The Flash, made a guest appearance in the episode "All for Nothing", while the character Barry Allen / The Flash did so in the following episode "The Devil's Greatest Trick"; Grant Gustin did not film any scenes, since the character is only shown speeding through lightning.

Release

Broadcast 
The season began airing in the United States on The CW on October 12, 2017, and completed its 23-episode run on May 17, 2018.

Home media 
The season was released on DVD and Blu-ray on August 14, 2018 with special features including the fourth annual Arrowverse crossover event titled "Crisis on Earth-X". It began streaming on Netflix in May 2018, soon after the season finale aired.

Reception

Critical response 
The review aggregation website Rotten Tomatoes reported a 64% approval rating for the sixth season, with an average rating of 6.86/10 based on 7 reviews. The website's critical consensus reads, "Arrow sixth season deals with the literal fallout from the explosion in season five's finale and promises a drastic change in direction for the series." Jesse Schedeen of IGN rated the entire season 6.7 out of 10, saying, "Arrow sixth season may not qualify as the show's worst, but only because it improved a great deal in its final two months. Prior to that, the season squandered most of the potential afforded by Season 5, failing to balance its many characters and languishing under a disappointingly bland villain. It's good that the show eventually regained its footing, but there's no reason things should have gone so far off the rails in the first place."

Ratings

Accolades 

|-
! scope="row" rowspan="8" | 2018
| rowspan="2" | Leo Awards
| Best Cinematography Dramatic Series
| data-sort-value="Robson, Corey" | Corey Robson ("Who Are You?")
| 
| 
|-
| Best Stunt Coordination Dramatic Series
| data-sort-value="Braconnier, Curtis" | Curtis Braconnier, Eli Zagoudakis ("Fallout")
| 
| 
|-
| People's Choice Awards
| The Sci-Fi/Fantasy Show of 2018
| data-sort-value="Arrow" | Arrow
| 
| 
|-
| Saturn Awards
| Best Superhero Adaptation Television Series
| data-sort-value="Arrow" | Arrow
| 
| 
|-
| rowspan="4" | Teen Choice Awards
| Choice Action TV Actor
| data-sort-value="Amell, Stephen" | Stephen Amell
| 
| 
|-
| Choice Action TV Actress
| data-sort-value="Rickards, Emily Bett" | Emily Bett Rickards
| 
| 
|-
| Choice TV Ship
| data-sort-value="Amell, Stephen and Emily Bett Rickards" | Stephen Amell and Emily Bett Rickards
| 
| 
|-
| Choice Action TV Show
| data-sort-value="Arrow" | Arrow
| 
| 
|}

Notes

References

External links 

 
 

Arrow (TV series) seasons
2017 American television seasons
2018 American television seasons
Impeachment in fiction